James Jones (died January 11, 1801) was an American politician and lawyer from the State of Georgia.

Early years and education
Jones moved with his uncle to Georgia in 1740. He studied law in Savannah, Georgia, and gained admission to the state bar and became a practicing attorney. In 1790, he also served as a first lieutenant in the Georgia Militia.

Political career
Elected to the Georgia House of Representatives in 1796, Jones was re-elected in 1798 but later resigned. While seeking re-election to the Georgia House of Representatives, Jones simultaneously ran for a seat in the United States House of Representatives. In the election of 1798, Georgia used a statewide at-large method to elect two members to serve in the 6th Congress of the United States. Jones received 4,264 votes (37.3%), ahead of the second-place finisher, Benjamin Taliaferro, who received 3,823 votes (33.4%). Both Jones and Taliaferro ran as candidates on the Federalist Party ticket. The incumbent, Abraham Baldwin, running as a Democratic-Republican, came in a distant third with 3,135 votes (27.4%) Jones resigned from the Georgia General Assembly and took his seat in Congress instead. In 1798, Jones also served on the state constitutional convention.

Death and legacy
Jones died while still serving in that position in 1801 and was buried in the Congressional Cemetery in Washington, D.C. Jones County, Georgia, was named in his honor.

See also 
 List of United States Congress members who died in office (1790–1899)

References

External links

William J. Northen, Men of Mark in Georgia, A. B. Caldwell, 1912, pp. 360–361.
Political Graveyard entry for James Jones

Year of birth unknown
1801 deaths
People from Maryland
American people of Welsh descent
Georgia (U.S. state) Federalists
Members of the Georgia House of Representatives
Members of the United States House of Representatives from Georgia (U.S. state)
Georgia (U.S. state) lawyers
Burials at the Congressional Cemetery
Federalist Party members of the United States House of Representatives